Jamie Greubel Poser (born November 9, 1983) née Greubel is an American bobsledder who won her first  Bobsleigh World Cup medal in December 2012. She won the Bronze medal at the 2014 Winter Olympics in the Two-woman Bobsleigh event.

Greubel graduated from the Hun School of Princeton in Princeton, New Jersey in 2002 and Cornell University in 2006. Greubel competed in field hockey and track in high school and was a heptathlete in college. She set Cornell records in the heptathlon and indoor pentathlon. She holds a master's degree in education.

Greubel took up bobsledding after graduating from college at the suggestion of one of her college track and field teammates. She first made the U.S. national bobsled team in 2007–2008 season Greubel started in the sport as a brakeman but switched over to pilot in 2010.

Personal life
Greubel became engaged to German bobsledder Christian Poser in April 2013. The couple married in the summer of 2014.

References

External links

1983 births
Living people
American female bobsledders
Bobsledders at the 2014 Winter Olympics
Bobsledders at the 2018 Winter Olympics
Cornell University alumni
People from Arlington, Massachusetts
People from Princeton, New Jersey
Hun School of Princeton alumni
Sportspeople from Middlesex County, Massachusetts
Medalists at the 2014 Winter Olympics
Olympic bronze medalists for the United States in bobsleigh
21st-century American women